Elya Svei (March 19, 1924 (Taanis Esther 5684) – March 26, 2009 (Rosh Chodesh Nisan 5769)) was an American Haredi Jewish rabbi and co-rosh yeshiva (with Shmuel Kamenetsky) of the Talmudical Yeshiva of Philadelphia. He was born in Kaunas and died in Philadelphia.

Biography 
Elya Svei was born in Kaunas, Lithuania, where his father Shmuel Leib Svei was a rabbi. When he was nine years old he moved to the United States to join his father, who was fundraising there. In the United States he attended Yeshiva Torah Vodaath, graduating its Hebrew Parochial High School division in 1941.

Svei was a student of Aharon Kotler. He was a member of the Moetzes Gedolei HaTorah and chairman of the Rabbinic Administrative Board of Torah Umesorah until he resigned from both in June 2002, reportedly due to an ideological dispute with his colleagues.

Svei was a founder of Sinai Academy in Brooklyn, a middle school and high school catering to the children of primarily non-observant Russian Jewish immigrants.

References

1924 births
2009 deaths
20th-century American rabbis
20th-century Israeli rabbis
21st-century American rabbis
21st-century Israeli rabbis
American Haredi rabbis
Haredi rabbis in Israel
Haredi rosh yeshivas
Israeli people of Lithuanian-Jewish descent
Israeli people of Russian-Jewish descent
Israeli Rosh yeshivas
Lithuanian emigrants to the United States
Lithuanian Haredi rabbis
Moetzes Gedolei HaTorah
Rabbis in Jerusalem
Russian expatriates in the United States
Russian Haredi rabbis
Soviet emigrants to Israel
Soviet emigrants to the United States